Ein HaHoresh (lit. "the plower's spring" / "the plowman's fountain") is a kibbutz in central Israel. Located to the north of Netanya, it falls under the jurisdiction of Hefer Valley Regional Council.

History
It was founded in November 1931 by Hashomer Hatzair members from Eastern Europe who reclaimed the land. It was one of the first settlements in the northern part of the Emek Hefer. The kibbutz was named after Wadi el Hawarith, the Arab name for the area where it was located.

The kibbutz was cordoned off and occupied by the British in December 1945 in connection with the struggle for free immigration. It was cordoned off and occupied by the British again in June 1946 along with its neighbor, Givat Haim. As part of the war effort, the kibbutz stepped up its food production. By 1947 the kibbutz had a population of 450.

Economy
The kibbutz developed a successful mixed intensive farm. By 1968 it had 570 inhabitants engaged in intensive farming in citrus plantations, and producing milch cattle. The kibbutz also ran a factory producing sheet steel casks.

Gallery

Notable people
 Abba Kovner (1918–1987), poet, writer and partisan leader
 Amos Meller (1938–2007), composer and conductor
 Benny Morris (born 1948), historian
 Sagol 59 (born Khen Rotem, 1968), rapper, songwriter and guitarist
 Jasmin Vardimon MBE (Born 1971), Choreographer and dancer

References

External links

 

Kibbutzim
Kibbutz Movement
Populated places established in 1931
Jewish villages in Mandatory Palestine
Populated places in Central District (Israel)
1931 establishments in Mandatory Palestine